The 2003 Montreal Alouettes finished in first place in the East Division with a 13–5 record. For the second year in a row they defeated the Toronto Argonauts in the East Final, advancing to face Edmonton for the second Grey Cup in a row. The Eskimos got their revenge, defeating the Alouettes 34–22 in the Grey Cup.

Offseason

CFL draft

Preseason

Regular season

Season standings

Season schedule

Roster

Playoffs

Scotiabank East Final

Grey Cup

Awards

2003 CFL All-Star Selections
Anthony Calvillo – Quarterback
Jeremaine Copeland – Slotback
Uzooma Okeke – Offensive Tackle
Scott Flory – Offensive Guard
Bryan Chiu – Centre

2003 CFL Eastern All-Star Selections
Anthony calvillo – Quarterback
Ben Cahoon – Slotback
Jeremaine copeland – Slotback
Kwame Cavil – Wide Receiver
Neal Fort – Offensive Tackle
Uzooma okeke – Offensive Tackle
Scott flory – Offensive Guard
Bryan chiu – Centre
Anwar Stewart – Defensive End
Ed Philion – Defensive Tackle
Kevin Johnson – Linebacker
Tim Strickland – Linebacker
Barron Miles – Defensive Back

2003 Intergold CFLPA All-Star Selections

References

Montreal Alouettes
Montreal Alouettes seasons
James S. Dixon Trophy championship seasons